A list of Phi Delta Phi inns includes the law school chapters of Phi Delta Phi. Chapters are known as Inns, that term being derived from the English Inns of Court. Each Inn is named for a noted jurist or member of the bar, as follows:

Inns 

Note: This list includes Inns that are no longer active.

1800s 

 Kent Inn, University of Michigan, 1869
 Sharswood Inn, University of Pennsylvania, 1875
 Benjamin Inn, Illinois Wesleyan University, 1878
 Booth Inn, Northwestern University, 1880
 Story Inn, Columbia University, 1881
 Cooley Inn, Washington University in St. Louis, 1882
 Pomeroy Inn, University of California, Hastings College of the Law, 1883
 John Marshall Inn, George Washington University, 1884
 Jay Inn, Albany Law School, 1884
 Webster Inn, Boston University, 1885
 Hamilton Inn, University of Cincinnati, 1886
 Gibson-Alexander Inn, University of Pennsylvania, 1886
 Choate Inn, Harvard University, 1887
 Waite Inn, Yale University, 1887
 Field Inn, New York University, 1888
 Conkling Inn, Cornell University, 1888
 Tiedeman Inn, University of Missouri School of Law, 1890
 Minor Inn, University of Virginia, 1890
 Dillon Inn, University of Minnesota, 1890
 Daniels Inn, State University of New York, 1891
 Chase Inn, University of Oregon, 1891
 Harlan Inn, University of Wisconsin–Madison, 1891
 Swan Inn, Ohio State University, 1893
 McClain Inn, University of Iowa, 1893
 Lincoln Inn, University of Nebraska, 1895
 Osgoode Inn, York University, 1896
 Fuller Inn, Chicago-Kent College of Law, 1896
 Miller Inn, Stanford University, 1897
 Green Inn, University of Kansas, 1897
 Comstock Inn, Syracuse University, 1898
 Dwight Inn, New York Law School, 1899

1900-1949 

 Foster Inn, Indiana University, 1900
 Ranney Inn, Case Western Reserve University, 1901
 Langdell Inn, University of Illinois at Urbana-Champaign, 1901
 Brewer Inn, University of Denver, 1902
 Douglas Inn, University of Chicago, 1903
 Ballinger Inn, University of Washington, 1907
 Malone Inn, Vanderbilt University, 1907
 Evarts Inn, St. Lawrence University, 1907
 Thomas Inn, University of Colorado, 1907
 Beatty Inn, University of Southern California, 1907
 Reed Inn, University of Maine, 1908
 Tucker Inn, Washington and Lee University, 1908
 Roberts Inn, University of Texas, 1909
 Shiras Inn, University of Pittsburgh, 1909
 Holmes Inn, University of Oklahoma, 1912
 Ames Inn, University of South Dakota, 1912
 Bruce Inn, University of North Dakota, 1912
 White Inn, Tulane University, 1912
 Jones Inn, University of California, Berkeley, 1913
 Roosevelt Inn, University of Tennessee, 1920
 Cockrell Inn, University of Florida, 1920
 Vance Inn, University of North Carolina, 1920
 deGraffenried Inn, University of Alabama, 1922
 Wilson Inn, University of Georgia, 1922
 Clayberg Inn, University of Montana, 1922
 Brooke Inn, West Virginia University, 1922
 Lamar Inn, Emory University, 1924
 Breckinridge Inn, University of Kentucky, 1925
 Weldon Inn, Dalhousie Law School, 1926
 Mayes Inn, University of Mississippi, 1927
 Jean Galloway Bissell Inn (formerly Calhoun Inn), University of South Carolina, 1927
 Martin Inn, Louisiana State University, 1927
 Pattee Inn, University of Arizona, 1929
 Hughes Inn, Duke University, 1931
 Taft Inn, St. John's University, 1931
 Aggeler Inn, Loyola University, 1937
 Conwell Inn, Temple University, 1937
 Powell Inn, University of Missouri–Kansas City, 1942
 McNary Inn, Willamette University, 1947
 Johnson Inn, University of Utah, 1947
 Scott Inn, Georgetown University, 1947
 Bryan Inn, University of Miami, 1947
 Willkie Inn, Indiana University Robert H. McKinney School of Law, 1947
 Ruffin Inn, Wake Forest University, 1947
 Cardozo Inn, Stetson University, 1947
 Murphy Inn, St. Louis University, 1949
 Hemphill Inn, Baylor University, 1949
 Tarlton Inn, St. Mary's University, 1949

1950-1999 

 Beasley Inn, Rutgers School of Law–Newark, 1950
 Pound Inn, University of California at Los Angeles, 1951
 Hutcheson Inn, University of Houston, 1953
 Stone Inn, Marquette University, 1957
 Rogers Inn, University of Tulsa, 1959
 Stephens Inn, University of San Francisco, 1959
 Monteith Inn, Southern Methodist University, 1959
 Hand Inn, Oklahoma City University, 1961
 George Inn, Mercer University School of Law, 1964
 Jefferson Inn, The College of William & Mary Law School, 1965
 Stevenson Inn, University of Memphis, 1968?
 Shields Inn, University of the Pacific, McGeorge School of Law, 1969
 McFarland Inn, Arizona State University, 1971
 Black Inn, Loyola University New Orleans, 1972
 Velasco Inn, Escuela Libre de Derecho, 1973
 Landon Inn, Washburn University, 1974
 Santos Theriot Inn, Universidad de Monterrey, 1975
 Ford Inn, Vermont Law School, 1976
 Rehnquist Inn, Suffolk University Law School, 1976
 Stevens Inn, The John Marshall Law School, 1976
 Warren Inn, Texas Tech University School of Law, 1976
 Moynihan Inn, Boston College, 1977
 Cox Inn, Western New England College School of Law, 1978
 Recasens Siches, Universidad Anáhuac, 1978
 Sutherland Inn, Brigham Young University, 1979
 Rand Inn, The University of Western Ontario, Western Law School, 1979
 Prosser Inn, Pepperdine University School of Law, 1979
 Harrington Inn, Widener University School of Law, Delaware, 1981
 Wood Inn, South Texas College of Law, 1982
 Carroll Inn, University of Baltimore School of Law, 1983
 Martland Inn, University of Ottawa Faculty of Law, 1983
 Keady Inn, Mississippi College School of Law, 1985
 Deady Inn, Lewis & Clark Law School, 1987
 Villoro Toronzo Inn, Universidad Iberoamericana, 1987
 Lesar Inn, Southern Illinois University, 1987
 Burns Inn, Quinnipiac University School of Law, 1988
 Palacios Macedo Inn, Instituto Tecnologico Autonomo de Mexico, 1988
 Guerrero Inn, Universidad LaSalle de Mexico, 1988
 Salinas-Martinez Inn, Facultad Libre de Derecho de Monterrey, 1989
 Garcia Rendon Inn, ITESM, Campus Monterrey, 1989
 Borja Soriano Inn, Universidad Panamericana, 1989
 Mash Inn, Golden Gate University School of Law, 1990
 Herrera y Lasso Inn, Universidad Anahuac del Sur, 1991
 Rojina-Villegas Inn, Universidad Intercontinental, 1991
 Paca Inn, University of Maryland, 1992.
 Maher Inn, Western Michigan University Cooley Law School - Lansing Campus, 1993
 Mitchell Inn, William Mitchell College of Law, 1993
 Rosen Inn, The University of Akron School of Law, 1993
 Lafragua Inn, Universidad de las Americas Puebla, 1995
 Elliott Inn, Texas A&M University School of Law (formerly Texas Wesleyan University School of Law), 1995
 Cabrera Inn, Universidad Iberoamericana Golfo Central, 1997

2000s 

 Mazpulez Perez Inn, ITESM Campus Chihuahua, 2000
 John McClellan Marshall Inn, Uniwersytet Marii Curie Sklodowska, Lublin, 2000
 McLachlin Inn, University of British Columbia, 2001
 Bradlee Inn, New England School of Law, 2001
 Stanley Mosk Inn, Chapman University School of Law, 2002
 Blackwell Inn, Appalachian School of Law, 2003 
 Ayala Villarreal Inn Universidad Autonoma de Nuevo Leon, 2003
 Góngora Pimentel Inn, Universidad Contemporanea, 2005
 Santamaria Inn, Universidad Juarez Autonoma Tabasco, 2005
 Mariano Otero Inn, ITESM Campus Guadalajara, 2006
 Roman Herzog Inn, Bucerius Law School, 2006
 Burgoa Inn, ITESM Campus Estado de México, 2007
 J. Reed Inn, Penn State Dickinson School of Law, 2007
 Richard v. Weizsäcker Inn, Universität Tübingen, 2008
 Hauriou Inn, ITESM Campus Puebla, 2010
 Castor Inn, Thomas M. Cooley Law School - Tampa Bay Campus, 2013
 Villar Y Calvo Inn, ITESM Campus Toluca -2013
 Michael Hoffmann-Becking Inn, Goethe University Frankfurt, 2013
 Cruz Miramontes Inn, Universidad Autónoma de Chihuahua, 2017

References

Legal organizations based in the United States
Lists of chapters of United States student societies by society
Inns